Flor Silvestre con el Mariachi México is a studio album by Mexican singer Flor Silvestre, released by Musart Records. It is Flor Silvestre's second Musart album and contains her 1961 version of "Cielo rojo", one of her signature songs.

It was a great success, and all twelve of its tracks were included in the greatest hits album Los éxitos de Flor Silvestre.

Background
This is Flor Silvestre's second studio album for Musart. It features her hit singles from the early 1960s as well as "Échame a mí la culpa" and "Amémonos", two tracks from her previous Musart album, Flor Silvestre. She is accompanied by Pepe Villa's Mariachi México on all tracks except "Amémonos", which she recorded with the Mariachi Zapopan.

Track listing
Side one

Side two

Personnel
 Mariachi México de Pepe Villa – accompaniment
 Mariachi Zapopan – accompaniment

Notes

External links
 Flor Silvestre con el Mariachi México at Rate Your Music

Flor Silvestre albums
Musart Records albums
Spanish-language albums